The world's longest suspension bridges are listed according to the length of their main span (i.e. the length of suspended roadway between the bridge's towers). The length of main span is the most common method of comparing the sizes of suspension bridges, often correlating with the height of the towers and the engineering complexity involved in designing and constructing the bridge. If one bridge has a longer span than another it does not necessarily mean that the bridge is longer from shore to shore (or from abutment to abutment).

Suspension bridges have the longest spans of any type of bridge. Cable-stayed bridges, the next longest design, are practical for spans up to just over 1 kilometre. Therefore, the 31 longest bridges on this list are the 31 longest spans of all types of vehicular bridges (other than floating pontoon bridges).

Since 1998, the Akashi Kaikyō Bridge in Japan previously held the record, with a span of 1,991 metres (6,532 ft).

Completed suspension bridges 
This list includes only completed suspension bridges that carry automobiles or trains. It does not include cable-stayed bridges, footbridges, or pipeline bridges.

Bridges under construction
Most of the large suspension bridges built in recent years have been in the People's Republic of China. As the following list shows, most of the bridges under construction are also in China.

History of longest suspension spans

Sources:

Other record-holding suspension bridges

 Sidu River Bridge (China). Opened in 2009, it is the highest suspension bridge in the world at 472 m elevation and the second highest bridge of any type.
 San Francisco–Oakland Bay Bridge Eastern Span (California, United States). Opened in 2013, it is the widest bridge in the world, the most expensive bridge and the largest self-anchored suspension bridge ever constructed.
 Tacoma Narrows Bridges (Washington, United States). Opened in 1950 and 2007, the pair of bridges with the longest spans in the world.
 Yavuz Sultan Selim Bridge (Turkey). Opened in 2016, it has longest span carrying road and rail traffic.
Yangsigang Yangtze River Bridge (China). Opened in 2019 with the longest double deck span.
 George Washington Bridge (New York and New Jersey, United States). Opened in 1931, it is the suspension bridge with the most lanes of traffic (at fourteen total on two levels).
 Kurushima-Kaikyō Bridge (Japan). Opened in 1999, it is the world's longest suspension bridge structure. 
 Great Seto Bridge (Japan). Opened in 1978 and 1988, it is the longest two-tiered bridge system (but not all of the spans that make up the bridge system are suspension bridges).
Sky Bridge 721 (Czech Republic). Opened in 2022, it is the longest suspension pedestrian bridge in the world (721 m).

See also
 Cable-stayed suspension bridge

Notes

References

Note: Some of the information posted on the following sites may differ from that above. As of 21 February 2006, the sites were out of date or inaccurate as noted in parenthesis
 Denenberg, David, Bridgemeister.com (an extensive inventory of more than 4,600 suspension bridges)
 Janberg, Nicolas, Suspension bridges, Structurae.de (an extensive database of structures including many suspension bridges)
 Durkee, Jackson, "World's Longest Bridge Spans", National Steel Bridge Alliance, 24 May 1999 (out of date)
 The World's Greatest Bridges, Archive.org copy of The Bridge over the Strait of Messina website (out of date and other errors)
 List of longest spans, Pub Quiz Help (includes bridges that have not yet been completed)
 Steel bridges in the world, and other bridge statistics, The Swedish Institute of Steel Construction, March 2003 (out of date)
 Virola, Eur Ing Juhani, Two Millennia - Two Long-Span Suspension Bridges, Australian Academy of Technological Sciences and Engineering, ATSE Focus No 124, November/December 2002 (revised information up to date as of 2005)
 Virola, Eur Ing Juhani, World's Longest Bridge Spans  Laboratory of Bridge Engineering (LBE), Helsinki University of Technology (includes bridges that have not yet been completed)

Further reading
 —includes a list of major suspension bridges by length

External links
 
 Progress of Center Span on Long-Span Bridges at the Honshū—Shikoku Bridge Expressway Co.

Suspension bridges, List of largest
Suspension bridges, List of largest
Bridges, suspension

Lists of construction records
Bridges, suspension